Wilson Township may refer to the following places in the United States:

Arkansas

 Wilson Township, Clay County, Arkansas
 Wilson Township, Faulkner County, Arkansas
 Wilson Township, Fulton County, Arkansas
 Wilson Township, Pope County, Arkansas
 Wilson Township, Stone County, Arkansas

Illinois

 Wilson Township, DeWitt County, Illinois

Iowa

 Wilson Township, Osceola County, Iowa

Kansas

 Wilson Township, Ellsworth County, Kansas
 Wilson Township, Lane County, Kansas
 Wilson Township, Marion County, Kansas
 Wilson Township, Rice County, Kansas

Michigan

 Wilson Township, Alpena County, Michigan
 Wilson Township, Charlevoix County, Michigan

Minnesota

 Wilson Township, Cass County, Minnesota
 Wilson Township, Winona County, Minnesota

Missouri

 Wilson Township, Adair County, Missouri
 Wilson Township, Audrain County, Missouri
 Wilson Township, Dallas County, Missouri
 Wilson Township, Gentry County, Missouri
 Wilson Township, Greene County, Missouri
 Wilson Township, Grundy County, Missouri
 Wilson Township, Putnam County, Missouri

North Carolina

 Wilson Township, Wilson County, North Carolina

North Dakota

 Wilson Township, Burleigh County, North Dakota

Ohio

 Wilson Township, Clinton County, Ohio

Oklahoma

 Wilson Township, Atoka County, Oklahoma
 Wilson Township, Carter County, Oklahoma
 Wilson Township, Choctaw County, Oklahoma
 Wilson Township, Harper County, Oklahoma
 Wilson Township, McCurtain County, Oklahoma

South Dakota

 Wilson Township, Perkins County, South Dakota

See also

Wilson (disambiguation)

Township name disambiguation pages